Silent treatment is the refusal to communicate verbally and electronically with someone who is trying to communicate and elicit a response. It may range from just sulking to malevolent abusive controlling behaviour. It may be a passive-aggressive form of emotional abuse in which displeasure, disapproval and contempt is exhibited through nonverbal gestures while maintaining verbal silence. Clinical psychologist Harriet Braiker identifies it as a form of manipulative punishment. It may be used as a form of social rejection; according to the social psychologist Kipling Williams it is the most common form of ostracism.

Origin of term 
The term originated from "treatment" through silence, which was fashionable in prisons in the 19th century. In use since the prison reforms of 1835, the silent treatment was used in prisons as an alternative to physical punishment, as it was believed that forbidding prisoners from speaking, calling them by a number rather than their name, and making them cover their faces so they couldn't see each other would encourage reflection on their crimes.

In interpersonal relationships 
In a relationship, the silent treatment can be a difficult pattern to break and resolve because if it is ingrained, relationships may gradually deteriorate. The silent treatment is more likely to be used by individuals with low self-esteem and a low tolerance for conflict. In order to avoid conflict, an individual will refuse to acknowledge it and will sometimes use silent treatment as a control mechanism. Enactors of the silent treatment punish their victims by refusing to speak to them or even acknowledge their presence. Through silence, the enactors "loudly" communicate their displeasure, anger, upset and frustration. The consequences of this behavior on the person at the receiving end by silence are feelings of alienation, confusion, incompetence, frustration, and self-worthlessness. These feelings can elicit a maladaptive response from victims with high rejection sensitivity levels, which can often lead to violence and more physical displays of aggression.  

Purposeful silence is a form of attention seeking behavior and can generate desired responses, such as attention, or a feeling of power from creating uncertainty for the victim. Unfortunately, the avoidance of conflict in the form of silent treatment is psychologically exhausting for all involved parties and leads to the irreparable deterioration of meaningful romantic, and familial relationships.

In the workplace 
Research by the Workplace Bullying Institute suggests that "using the silent treatment to ice out & separate from others" is the fourth most common of all workplace bullying tactics experienced, and is reported in 64 percent of cases of workplace bullying. The silent treatment is a recognized form of abusive supervision. Other forms include: reminding the victim of past failures, failing to give proper credit, wrongfully assigning blame or blowing up in fits of temper.

Tactical ignoring 

Silence and non-responsiveness are not only passive aggressive forms of manipulation and attention seeking; they can also be used as tools to promote changes in behavior. Tactical ignoring is a strategy where a person gives no outward sign of recognizing a behavior, such as no eye contact, no verbal or physical response, or acknowledgment that a message has been read. However, it is a very active process as the person remains acutely aware of the behavior and monitors the individual to observe what the individual has planned and ensure their safety or the safety of others. It is a technique that is often employed in parent-child relationships and is similar to the silent treatment because tactical ignoring is a behavioral management technique that, when correctly applied, can convey the message that a person's behavior will not lead to their desired outcome. It may also result in the reduction of undesirable behaviors.

One of the principles of tactical ignoring is to analyze the  behavior to see the message that is being communicated by the individual. This message, the need for attention or to gain a reaction, requires a response. The aim is to provide the person with positive and quality attention for displaying appropriate behaviors, or for not displaying the undesired behavior. When the person displays the undesired behavior in order to gain attention, the tactical ignoring strategy is to ignore the behavior. This strategy uses the same foundation as that underlying positive behavior support and applied behavior analysis in that positive behavior is encouraged with reinforcement, and unwanted behaviors are discouraged with negative reinforcement or punishment. The use of tactical ignoring is taught in parent management training, but is also suitable for changing or shunning adult behavior. 

Tactical ignoring can be one element of a behavior management plan when there are a variety of challenging behaviors being addressed. Because it is a method that involves not responding to an undesirable behavior, it should be complemented by differential reinforcement for an alternative behavior, as seen in functional communication training, a procedure to teach a more appropriate attention-seeking behavior. Planned ignoring can be used for mild and low impact in terms of helping behavioral issues stemming from attention seeking and power struggles. Power struggles are when a child refuses to do something and it is an ongoing battle of insisting the child to comply.

See also

References

Further reading 
 The “silent treatment”. Its incidence and impact. Paper presented at the sixty-ninth Annual Midwestern Psychological Association, Chicago, IL. Ferguson, M., and .. 1997
 Kipling D. Williams Wendelyn J. Shore Jon E. Grahe. The silent treatment: Perceptions of its behaviors and associated feelings – Group Processes Intergroup Relations October 1998 vol. 1 no. 2 117–141
 Zadro, L., Richardson, R., & Williams, K. D. (2006, January). The antecedents of interpersonal ostracism: Do individual differences predict propensity to be a target or source of the silent treatment? Presented at the 7th annual meeting of the Society for Personality and Social Psychology, Palm Springs, CA.
 Grahe, J. E., Shore, W. J., & Williams, K. D. (1997, May). Perceptions of the behaviors and feelings associated with the “silent treatment.”Presented at the 69th Annual Midwestern Psychological Association, Chicago.
 Faulkner, S, Williams, K., Sherman, B., & Williams, E. (1997, May). The “silent treatment:” Its incidence and impact. Presented at the 69 th Annual Midwestern Psychological Association, Chicago.[Summarized in New Scientist, 1998, April, p. 18]

External links 
 What's up with the Silent Treatment?
 Research: Office silent treatment ‘worse than bullying’
 The Silent Treatment: Are You Getting the Cold Shoulder?
 The Silent Marriage: How Passive Aggression Steals Your Happiness (The Complete Guide to Passive Aggression) [Kindle Edition]|

English phrases
Shunning
Silence
Social rejection